Bernardo Verbitsky (22 November 1907 – 15 March 1979) was an Argentine writer and journalist.

Biography 
Verbitsky was born of Ukrainian-Jewish immigrant parents (his surname Verbitsky means willow in Ukrainian). He was a screenwriter, a journalist from Noticias Gráficas, and a member of Academia Porteña del Lunfardo ("Buenos Aires Lunfardo's Academy"). He reported Buenos Aires' ups and downs; his writings were linked to tango and other essential aspects of the city. Hugo del Carril based its 1958 motion picture Una cita con la vida ("A date with life" ) on Verbitsky's novel Calles de tango)

His 1957 novel Villa Miseria también es América (roughly "Povertyville is also [a part of] America") gave its popular name to Argentina's shanty towns (villas miseria).

Bernardo Verbitsky died in Buenos Aires on 15 March 1979.

Verbitsky is the father of journalist and activist Horacio Verbitsky.

Books in Spanish
Es difícil empezar a vivir ("It's hard to start living") (1940)
Significación de Stefan Zweig -ensayo- (1942)
En estos años ("During these years") (1947)
Café de los Angelitos y otros cuentos porteños ("Little Angels' Café and other porteño stories") (1950)
Una pequeña familia ("A small family") (1951)
La esquina ("The corner") (1953)
Calles de tango ("Tango streets") (1953)
Vacaciones ("Vacations") (1953)
Un noviazgo ("A relationship") (1956)
Villa Miseria también es América ("Povertyville is also America") (1957)
Megatón -poemas- (1959)
El teatro de Arthur Miller -ensayo- (1959)
La tierra es azul ("The Earth is blue") (1961)
Hamlet y Don Quijote (ensayo) (1964)
Un hombre de papel (1966)
La neurosis monta su espectáculo (1969)
Etiquetas a los hombres -edit. in Barcelona- (1972)
Enamorado de Joan Baez -edit. in Barcelona- (1975)
Literatura y consciencia nacional -ensayos- (1975)
Octubre maduro -stories- (1976)
Hermana y sombra (1977)
A pesar de todo -stories- (1978)

Awards 
"Ricardo Güiraldes" award, (in trial with Jorge Luis Borges, Guillermo De Torre y Norah Lange) by Es Difícil Empezar a Vivir (1941).
"Alberto Gerchunoff" award (1965) by Es Difícil Empezar a Vivir.
"Faja de Honor" of the Writer's Argentina Society (SADE) by En esos años.
"Municipal" award by Villa Miseria También Es América.
Mention in an award from Kraft Edit. by Villa Miseria también es América.
"Faja de Honor" of the SADE by La Neurosis Monta Su Espectáculo.
"Club of the XIII" by Hermana Y Sombra.
Dupuytrén Foundation award by Hermana Y Sombra.

Further reading 
Argentina's Jewish Short Story Writers, Rita M. Gardiol, 1986.
Irene Caselli: Fighting for Basic Services, and News, in the Slums, 2015

References

Sources 
 This article draws from the corresponding article in the Spanish Wikipedia.

Jewish Argentine writers
Argentine journalists
Male journalists
1907 births
1979 deaths
People from Buenos Aires
Argentine people of Russian-Jewish descent
Argentine Jews
20th-century journalists